is a Japanese model, actress, and singer-songwriter who is affiliated with Rising Production. She is the younger sister of model, actress, and BeForU member Hiromi Nishiuchi.

Filmography

TV series

Films

Discography

Singles

Magazines
 Nicola, Shinchosha 1997-, as an exclusive model from 2007 to 2010
 Seventeen, Shueisha 1967-, as an exclusive model from 2010 to 2015

References

External links

 Official profile at Rising Production 
  
 Official profile at Seventeen On Line 
  

Japanese female models
Japanese women singer-songwriters
Japanese singer-songwriters
Japanese television personalities
Japanese voice actresses
1993 births
Living people
People from Fukuoka
Musicians from Fukuoka Prefecture
21st-century Japanese actresses
21st-century Japanese singers
Avex Group artists
21st-century Japanese women singers